Acrolophus walsinghami is a moth of the family Acrolophidae. It is found in Florida andPuerto Rico.

References

Moths described in 1890
walsinghami